Kyle Gardiner (born 8 December 1996) is an Australian cricketer. He is a right-handed batsman and right-arm leg-spin bowler. He made his List A debut for the National Performance Squad against Australia A on 16 August 2016.

References

External links

1996 births
Living people
Australian cricketers
Cricketers from Perth, Western Australia